Bas Itna Sa Khwaab Hai is a 2001 Indian Hindi-language romantic drama film written and directed by Goldie Behl. The film stars Abhishek Bachchan, Rani Mukerji, Sushmita Sen and Jackie Shroff. It was a disaster at the box office.

Synopsis 
Suraj (Abhishek Bachchan) is a simple village man who comes to Mumbai from Benaras to earn a degree in college. He gets smitten by a light-eyed beauty Pooja (Rani Mukerji). After some dilly-dallying, the duo expresses their love for each other.

Suraj has big dreams. He wants to emulate his mentor Naved Ali (Jackie Shroff) a shrewd media baron. Then, one day, in a heroic deed in which Suraj saves the life of a fatally wounded man, Suraj impresses Naved Ali. A flattered Naved sends his raunchy colleague Lara (Sushmita Sen) to rope in Suraj to start a new channel.

Slowly the callow youth becomes a clever businessman and Lara begins to take Pooja’s place. Pooja tries to convince Suraj of the futility of it all but only in vain. Suraj is determined to carve a place for himself in the higher echelons of society. Soon he has everything he ever wanted and dreamed of – a swanky bungalow, sleek cars, etc. But he has lost his innocence.

And one day Suraj realizes the dastardly motives of Naved Ali (who wants to become the PM of the country) and how he has been used as a pawn in his power game.

Cast 
 Abhishek Bachchan ... Surajchand "Suraj" Shrivastav
 Jackie Shroff ... Naved Ali
Rani Mukerji ... Pooja
 Sushmita Sen ...Lara Oberoi
 Gulshan Grover ... Sardar Sweety Singh
 Jennifer Kotwal...Suraj's sister
 Anang Desai ... Chandan Shrivastav (Suraj's dad)
 Smita Jaykar ... Mrs. Gayetri Shrivastav (Suraj's mom)
 Himani Shivpuri ... Gayetri's sister-in-law
 Sharat Saxena ... Balkishan Deshpande
 Suchitra Pillai-Malik ... Reporter (as Suchitra Pillai)

Soundtrack

All songs were composed by Aadesh Shrivastav.

Controversy 
The Delhi Police arrested two persons including film producer Tanya Behl on charges of assaulting two city photographers during the shooting of this movie.

References

External links 
 

2000s Hindi-language films
2001 films
Films scored by Aadesh Shrivastava
Films shot in Delhi
Films set in Mumbai
Films set in Uttar Pradesh
Rose Audio Visuals
2001 directorial debut films